"Girl's Best Friend" is a 1999 single by rapper Jay-Z that features vocals from Mashonda. It was released on August 9, 1999, as a single to promote the comedy film Blue Streak and appears on its soundtrack Blue Streak: The Album. In the same year, it appeared as a hidden track on Jay-Z's fourth album Vol. 3... Life and Times of S. Carter. Its beat, produced by Swizz Beatz, contains a sample of "Keep It Comin' Love" by KC and the Sunshine Band.

Martin Lawrence, the star of Blue Streak, makes a cameo in the music video (directed by Francis Lawrence) as his character's "Pizza Man" disguise, dancing to the song and making silly faces in the camera.

Formats and track listings
CD
 "Girl's Best Friend (Radio Version)" (3:26)
 "Girl's Best Friend (LP Version)" (3:59)
 "Girl's Best Friend (Instrumental)" (4:08)

Vinyl
A-side
 "Girls Best Friend"
 "Girls Best Friend (Radio Version)"

B-side
 "I Put You On"
 "While You Were Gone"

Charts

Weekly charts

Year-end charts

See also
List of songs recorded by Jay-Z

References

1999 singles
Jay-Z songs
Song recordings produced by Swizz Beatz
Music videos directed by Francis Lawrence
Songs written by Jay-Z
Songs written by Swizz Beatz
1999 songs
Roc-A-Fella Records singles